Arthur William Wallander, Sr. (February 3, 1892 - November 3, 1980) was New York City Police Commissioner from 1945 to 1949. He was the only Police Commissioner to be retained by an incoming Mayor of New York City.

Biography
He was born on February 3, 1892, in New York City to Eva Wallander of Sweden. He had a sister, Fanny I. Wallander. He was appointed as New York City Police Commissioner by Fiorello H. LaGuardia in 1945 and was asked to remain in office by William O'Dwyer when O'Dwyer became mayor. O'Dwyer had been trained by Wallander at the New York City Police Academy.

He died on November 3, 1980, at the Putnam-Weaver Nursing Home in Greenwich, Connecticut.

References

1892 births
1980 deaths
People from Greenwich, Connecticut
New York City Police Commissioners